Daniel Castelo Podence (born 21 October 1995) is a Portuguese professional footballer who plays as a winger for  club Wolverhampton Wanderers.

He started his career with Sporting CP, appearing in 40 competitive matches and also being loaned to Moreirense, with whom he won the 2017 Taça da Liga. He then joined Olympiacos, winning the 2019–20 Super League Greece. In January 2020, he signed with Wolverhampton Wanderers.

Podence made his full debut for Portugal in 2020.

Club career

Sporting CP
Born in Oeiras, Lisbon, Podence joined Sporting CP's youth system shortly before his 10th birthday, arriving from neighbouring C.F. Os Belenenses. On 3 February 2013, whilst still a junior, he made his senior debut, appearing for the former's reserves in a Segunda Liga match against C.S. Marítimo B after coming on as a late substitute for Bruma.

Podence played his first official game for the first team on 29 December 2014, starting in a 2–0 away win over Vitória S.C. in the final stages of the Taça da Liga. He was then loaned to Moreirense F.C. in a season-long move. He made his debut in the Primeira Liga on 17 September 2016 in a 2–0 loss at G.D. Estoril Praia, scoring his first goal in the competition on 29 October in another away fixture, against C.D. Tondela (a 2–1 victory). On 4 December 2016, his brace helped the hosts to a 3–1 win over C.D. Nacional, and he also made three appearances for the club in the League Cup campaign, which ended with them winning their first-ever trophy.

In late January 2017, Podence was recalled by Sporting manager Jorge Jesus. He terminated his contract on 1 June 2018, following a violent attack on the players by a number of their own supporters.

Olympiacos
On 9 July 2018, Podence joined Olympiacos F.C. on a five-year deal. His first competitive appearance took place on 9 August in a 4–0 home victory against FC Luzern in the third qualifying round of the UEFA Europa League, and he scored his first goal later that month in a 1–1 draw at Burnley in the same competition (4–2 aggregate win). He finished his first season in the Super League Greece with eight goals in all competitions, and the team finished in second place.

On 2 September 2019, after a litigation with Sporting, both clubs reached a €7 million settlement. Sixteen days later, in his first match in the group phase of the UEFA Champions League, Podence helped Olympiacos come back from a 2–0 home deficit to a 2–2 draw against Tottenham Hotspur, scoring in the 44th minute after an individual effort.

Wolverhampton Wanderers
On 30 January 2020, Podence moved to Wolverhampton Wanderers on a four-and-a-half-year contract for a £16.9 million transfer fee. He made his debut as a substitute, in a 0–0 draw with Manchester United at Old Trafford. His first start was on 27 February in the second leg of the Europa League's round of 32 away to RCD Espanyol, providing two assists in the 3–2 loss.

Podence's first start in the English Premier League was on 12 July 2020, in a 3–0 home defeat of Everton in which he drew the foul that resulted in a penalty (converted by Raúl Jiménez) that put the side 1–0 up at the end of the first half; Sky Sports named him "Player of the match" for his performance. He scored his first league goal the following weekend, with a header to open the scoring against Crystal Palace in an eventual 2–0 home win.

Podence scored his first league goal of the 2020–21 campaign on 30 October 2020, also against Crystal Palace and at Molineux Stadium, in a 2–0 victory. He was BBC Sport's Player of the match in a league game at home to Chelsea on 15 December, in which he scored his team's opening goal as they came from behind to win 2–1.

On 9 January 2022, Podence scored a brace – one in each half – in Wolves's 3–0 home defeat of Sheffield United in the third round of the FA Cup. His first in the domestic league in that season arrived on 20 February, in the 2–1 home win over Leicester City.

On 26 December 2022, Podence opened an eventual 2–1 victory at Everton in Julen Lopetegui's debut as new head coach; in this match, the player also celebrated his 75th league appearance for the club.

International career
Podence scored in his first two appearances for the Portuguese under-21 team, in October 2016 matches against Hungary (3–3) and Liechtenstein (7–1 rout) for the 2017 UEFA European Championship qualifying stage. Selected for the finals in Poland, he repeated the feat in the 4–2 group-phase victory over Macedonia.

In September 2019, Podence was called up to the senior squad for UEFA Euro 2020 qualifiers with Serbia and Lithuania. He made his debut 13 months later, playing 15 minutes in place of João Félix in a 3–0 home win against Sweden in the Nations League.

Career statistics

Club

International

Honours
Sporting CP
Taça de Portugal: 2014–15
Taça da Liga: 2017–18

Moreirense
Taça da Liga: 2016–17

Olympiacos
Super League Greece: 2019–20

Individual
Super League Greece Team of the Year: 2018–19

References

External links

1995 births
Living people
People from Oeiras, Portugal
Sportspeople from Lisbon District
Portuguese footballers
Association football wingers
Primeira Liga players
Liga Portugal 2 players
Sporting CP B players
Sporting CP footballers
Moreirense F.C. players
Super League Greece players
Olympiacos F.C. players
Premier League players
Wolverhampton Wanderers F.C. players
Portugal youth international footballers
Portugal under-21 international footballers
Portugal international footballers
Portuguese expatriate footballers
Expatriate footballers in Greece
Expatriate footballers in England
Portuguese expatriate sportspeople in Greece
Portuguese expatriate sportspeople in England